Matthew or Matt Harrison may refer to:

 Matthew Harrison (director) (born 1959), American television and film director
 Matthew Harrison (minister) (born 1962), American Lutheran clergyman
 Matthew Angelo Harrison (born 1989), American artist
 Matt Harrison (baseball) (born 1985), American baseball player